"The Wah-Watusi" is a song written by Kal Mann and Dave Appell and performed by The Orlons.  It reached No.2 on the U.S. pop chart behind Bobby Vinton's "Roses Are Red (My Love)", and No.5 on the U.S. R&B chart in 1962.  It was featured on their 1962 album The Wah-Watusi.

"The Wah-Watusi" sold over one million copies and was awarded gold disc status.

The song ranked No.24 on Billboard magazine's Top 100 singles of 1962.

Other versions
Dee Dee Sharp, on her 1962 compilation album All the Hits by Dee Dee Sharp.
Annette, as a single in 1964, but it did not chart.
The Miracles, on their 1963 album The Miracles Doin' Mickey's Monkey.
The Ronettes included their version on the 2011 various artists album The Philles Album Collection.  Their rendition had originally been released on The Crystals' 1963 album The Crystals Sing the Greatest Hits Volume 1, but The Crystals received credit for the song.

In popular culture
The Orlons' version was featured in the 2011 film The Help and was included on the soundtrack.
The Wachusett Mountain Ski Area in Massachusetts has adapted the song as a commercial jingle for a number of years.

In an episode of "Mama's Family," Naomi and her friend Luann are singing and dancing to it.

References

1962 songs
1962 singles
1964 singles
Songs about dancing
Songs with lyrics by Kal Mann
Songs written by Dave Appell
Dee Dee Sharp songs
The Miracles songs
Annette Funicello songs
The Ronettes songs